Cultural Center is a station on the Orange line of Kaohsiung MRT on the edge of Sinsing District and Lingya District, Kaohsiung, Taiwan.

Station overview

The station is a two-level, underground station with an island platform and four exits. The station is 199 metres long and is located at the intersection Jhongjheng 2nd Rd and Heping 1st Rd.

Station layout

Exits
Exit 1: Jhongjheng 2nd Rd. (west)
Exit 2: Shangyi St., Wufu Junior High School
Exit 3: Kaohsiung Cultural Center, National Kaohsiung Normal University
Exit 4: President Department Store Heping branch, Rainbow Park

Around the station
 Kaohsiung Cultural Center
 National Kaohsiung Normal University
 President Department Store
 Water Tower Park
 Wufu Junior High School

References

2008 establishments in Taiwan
Kaohsiung Metro Orange line stations
Lingya District
Railway stations opened in 2008